The 1984 British League season was the 50th season of the top tier of speedway in the United Kingdom and the 20th known as the British League.

Team changes
Three teams dropped out and four teams replaced them. Midland's clubs Birmingham Brummies and Leicester Lions both dropped out and Hackney Hawks dropped to the National League, becoming the Hackney Kestrels after taking over from the Crayford Kestrels. The new teams to the league were Oxford Cheetahs, Newcastle Diamonds, Exeter Falcons (all from the National League) and the returning Wolverhampton Wolves who did not ride in 1982 and 1983.

Summary
Oxford Cheetahs were financed by David Hawkins of Northern Sports. They bought Hans Nielsen from Birmingham for a record £30,000, Simon Wigg for £25,000 from Cradley Heath, Marvyn Cox for £15,000 from Rye House, Melvyn Taylor for £12,000 from King's Lynn and Jens Rasmussen. Defending champions Cradley Heath had a poor season after losing Wigg to Oxford and loaning Jan O. Pedersen to Sheffield Tigers in the National League.

The 50th season of British speedway saw Ipswich Witches win the league and cup double. The Suffolk team had a great season despite losing their leading rider Dennis Sigalos who rode for Wolverhampton Wolves during the season. Australian Billy Sanders remained one of the teams main scorers and he was supported by strong season scoring from American showman John Cook, Finn Kai Niemi and the English international pair of Jeremy Doncaster and Richard Knight.

Final table
M = Matches; W = Wins; D = Draws; L = Losses; Pts = Total Points

British League Knockout Cup
The 1984 Speedway Star British League Knockout Cup was the 46th edition of the Knockout Cup for tier one teams. Ipswich Witches were the winners.

First round

Quarter-finals

Semi-finals

Final
First leg

Second leg

Ipswich Witches were declared Knockout Cup Champions, winning on aggregate 92-64.

League Cup
The League Cup was split into North and South sections. The two-legged final was won by Cradley Heath Heathens beating Belle Vue Aces in the final 80-76 on aggregate.

South Group

North Group

Semi-finals

Final

Leading final averages

Riders & final averages
Belle Vue

 10.31
 9.10
 7.75
	7.25
 7.14
 6.66
 6.39
 2.00

Coventry

 7.87
 7.79
 6.89
 6.64
 6.18
 5.31 
 5.19
 2.62

Cradley Heath

 9.54
 8.65
 8.40
 7.87
 7.27
 5.08
 1.96
 1.49

Eastbourne

 9.42 
 8.07
 8.05
 6.76
 6.01
 4.91
 4.37
 4.18
 4.00
 3.81

Exeter

 8.08
 6.90
 6.01
 5.29
 5.27
 5.05
 4.98
 4.15
 2.59
 2.08
 2.00
 1.00

Halifax

 9.21
 7.44
 6.08
 5.16
 4.95
 4.64
 4.58
 3.52

Ipswich

 9.69
 8.83
 8.16
 7.98
7.43
 5.29 
 4.97
 3.53

King's Lynn

 8.29
 7.42 
 6.72 
 6.61
 6.38
 6.05
 4.00

Newcastle

 8.04
 7.01
 6.68
 5.84
 5.18
 4.82
 4.62
 4.13
 3.92

Oxford

 10.76
 9.69
 6.29
 6.06
 5.57
 4.59
 4.48
 4.15
 2.00
 1.93

Poole

 9.24
 6.71
 6.32
 6.15
 5.85
 5.77
 5.62
 3.54

Reading

 10.05
 9.26
 6.52
 5.75
 5.43
 5.41
 4.87

Sheffield

 9.85
 8.03 
 7.83 
 6.00
 6.00
 5.18
 4.77
 3.59
 2.94

Swindon

 9.94
 8.33
 6.15
 5.73
 5.33
 5.01
 4.95
 4.65
 3.78

Wimbledon

 8.38
 8.38
 7.18
 6.04
 5.82
 5.69
 5.45
 2.95

Wolverhampton

 9.87
 8.45 
 7.47
 7.23
 4.61
 4.52
 4.51
 3.69
 3.23
S 3.00
 2.90

See also
 List of United Kingdom Speedway League Champions
 Knockout Cup (speedway)

References

British League
1984 in British motorsport
1984 in speedway